Dornburg is a town in the Saale-Holzland district, in Thuringia, Germany. It sits atop a small hill of 400 ft above the Saale. Since 1 December 2008, it is part of the town Dornburg-Camburg.

History
Within the German Empire (1871–1918), Dornburg was part of the Grand Duchy of Saxe-Weimar-Eisenach.

Main sights
Dornburg is mainly known for its three grand ducal castles, once belonging to the former grand-dukes of Saxe-Weimar-Eisenach. These are:
Altes Schloss, which is built on the site of older castles from the early 12th century. One such castle was the Kaiserpfalz, often a residence of the emperors Otto II and Otto III, and where the emperor Henry II held a diet in 1005.
Neues Schloss or "Rokokoschloss", built in the Italian style in the years 1728–1748. It features pretty gardens that drew the likes of Goethe.
The third and southernmost of the three is the so-called Renaissanceschloss, which was built in the 17th century on the site of an older castle.

References

External links
A German site with statistics

Geography of Thuringia
Grand Duchy of Saxe-Weimar-Eisenach